The women's 500 metres speed skating competition of the 2010 Winter Olympics was held at the Richmond Olympic Oval on 16 February 2010.

Records 
Prior to this competition, the existing world and Olympic records were as follows.

500 meters (1 race)

500 meters x 2 (2 races)

No new world or Olympic records were set during this competition.

Results

References

External links 
 2010 Winter Olympics results: Ladies' 500 m (race 1), from http://www.vancouver2010.com/; retrieved 2010-02-15.
 2010 Winter Olympics results: Ladies' 500 m (race 2), from http://www.vancouver2010.com/; retrieved 2010-02-15.

Women's speed skating at the 2010 Winter Olympics